Croxton is a civil parish in North Lincolnshire, England.

In the 2001 Census the parish had a population of 36. At the 2011 census the population remained less than 100 and is included in civil parish of Kirmington.

Croxton Grade II* listed Anglican parish church is dedicated to St John the Evangelist. The church, mainly Early English, was restored by James Fowler of Louth in 1876.

Within the parish is Yarborough Camp where Roman coins have been found.

References

External links

Villages in the Borough of North Lincolnshire
Civil parishes in Lincolnshire